Zekharia is a moshav in central Israel. Located near Beit Shemesh, it falls under the jurisdiction of Mateh Yehuda Regional Council.

Geography
Zekharia is located off the road between Beit Guvrin and the Jerusalem-Jaffa highway. It is 268 meters above sea level. The mountain of Azekah can be seen directly to the south of the village.

History

Antiquity
Beth Zacharia (on a nearby hill) is said to have existed in Roman times. According to legend, the body of the prophet Zechariah was found here in 415 CE and a church and monastery were established in the lower village by the same name. The Madaba Map displays the lower town as the burial site of the prophet Zechariah.

Mamluk period
Under the Mamluks, the village was a dependency of Hebron, and formed part of the waqf supporting the Ibrahimi Mosque. The villagers obtained their drinking water from two communal wells:- al-Saflani well which was drilled next to Wadi 'Ajjur, and al-Sarara well located north of the village.

Ottoman period
In 1596, during the early Ottoman period, the village of Zakariyya al-Battikh had a population of 47 households and was part of the nahiya of Quds (Jerusalem). It was a Palestinian village in the Jerusalem corridor under the administrative jurisdiction of Bayt Jibrin.

State of Israel

In the 1948 Arab–Israeli War, Az-Zakariyya was the longest lasting Arab community in the southern Jerusalem Corridor. The villagers were evicted by the Israelis in three different phases, last eviction was carried out on June 9, 1950, on the orders of David Ben-Gurion, Moshe Sharett and Yosef Weitz, and most ended up on the-then Jordanian-occupied West Bank.

In 1950 Moshav Zekharia was established by Kurdish Jewish immigrants on the village site. During the 1960s, most of the older buildings in the village were decrepit and unsafe and had to be demolished to make room for new, safer housing.

In 1992, Walid Khalidi described the remaining structures of the Arab village: "The mosque and a number of houses, some occupied by Jewish residents and others deserted, remain on the site. Large sections of the site itself are covered with wild vegetation. The mosque is in a state of neglect and an Israeli flag is planted on top of the minaret. [..] One of the occupied houses is a two-storey stone structure with a flat roof. Its second story windows have round arches and grillwork. Parts of the surrounding lands are cultivated by Israeli farmers."

Landmarks
The tomb of Zecharia, which has been attributed to both the Hebrew prophet Zecharia and Zechariah, father of John the Baptist, is located on the moshav, within the mosque. The site is mentioned in sources as early as the fourth century, in the writings of Sozomenos, and it appears on the Madaba map.

In the 1970s, there was a resurgence of Jewish interest in the site, which became a pilgrimage destination for Jews from Iraq, Iran, Cochin and elsewhere in India, and elsewhere, who prayed there and lit candles.

Gallery

References

Bibliography

External links

Kurdish-Jewish culture in Israel
Moshavim
Populated places established in 1950
Populated places in Jerusalem District
1950 establishments in Israel